Nicole Stamp is a Canadian television host, director, actor, filmmaker, playwright, and voice actress.

Career 
Stamp works as a host, producer, and director, having started her career at TVOntario, where she co-hosted TVOntario's afternoon block, The SPACE, from 2003 to 2007. Stamp also hosted the Ontario Championships of Reach For The Top from 2004 until 2009.  She also could be seen on TVO playing EnviroGirl, an educational superhero in a live-action miniseries she also wrote.

Stamp has directed and hosted hundreds of red carpet talent interviews at the Toronto International Film Festival for Alliance Films and Tribute Media.

TVOntario won the "Best Interactive" Gemini Award for the series Time Trackers, a historical series hosted by Stamp in which she also voiced several animated characters.  Stamp also co-hosted TVOntario's Word Wizard, which was nominated for a Gemini Award for Best Interactive show. In total TVOntario has won 2 Geminis among 6 nominations for series in which Stamp hosted or performed lead roles.

Stamp improvised for two seasons with The Second City's Canadian National Touring Company,.  She is a Toronto native who attended Richview Collegiate Institute and earned her degree from the University of Toronto.

Stamp's voice work includes portraying Police Cadet Sanders in Total Drama Presents: The Ridonculous Race.  She has also voiced characters for videogame giant Ubisoft, and she voiced several characters in the TIFF short animated film Interregnum, about  Rene Carmille, a Frenchman who bravely saved thousands of people from the Nazis. She voices the conjoined snakes Laziel and Raziel in the Cartoon Network pilot The Wonderful Wingits.

As a writer, Stamp has been published by CNN  and in the National Post. She created a critically acclaimed solo show, BETTER PARTS, which garnered 5 N's from NOW Magazine and was called "intoxicatingly written and joyously performed" by The Globe and Mail.  Stamp has also been an invited member of the prestigious Playwrights' Unit at the Tarragon Theatre  and the Theatre Passe Muraille Playwrights' Collective.

As an actress, Stamp is internationally known for her portrayal of Melanippe "Mel" Callis in the Canadian Screen Award-winning webseries Carmilla, which has over 70 million views worldwide, as well as for her portrayal of Stamper on the Canadian Screen Award-winning webseries Tactical Girls.

As of 2016, Nicole Stamp is the director and co-host of Inside Between, the digital aftershow for the City Canada and Netflix Drama, Between.

As of 2017, Nicole Stamp reprised her role as Melanippe "Mel" Callis in the feature film The Carmilla Movie, set 5 years after the end of the webseries.

As of 2020, Stamp appeared in Episode 8 of the Netflix series Locke & Key as Nurse Ruth.

Filmography

Shows

References

External links

Nicole Stamp's official website
Nicole Stamp on YouTube

Year of birth missing (living people)
Living people
Black Canadian actresses
Canadian stage actresses
Canadian film actresses
Canadian television actresses
Canadian television directors
Canadian television hosts
Canadian television producers
Canadian women television producers
Canadian voice actresses
People from Etobicoke
Actresses from Toronto
Canadian women television hosts
Canadian women television directors